Yuriy Shulha (born 2 January 1966) is a Ukrainian speed skater. He competed at the 1992 Winter Olympics and the 1994 Winter Olympics.

References

1966 births
Living people
Ukrainian male speed skaters
Olympic speed skaters of the Unified Team
Olympic speed skaters of Ukraine
Speed skaters at the 1992 Winter Olympics
Speed skaters at the 1994 Winter Olympics
Sportspeople from Luhansk